Arnold Dyrdahl (July 14, 1919 – October 21, 1973) was a Norwegian bobsledder who competed from the late 1940s to the late 1950s. Competing in two Winter Olympics, he earned his best finish of tenth in the four-man event at St. Moritz in 1948.

He was born in Byåsen and died in Trondheim.

References
1948 bobsleigh four-man results
1956 bobsleigh four-man results

Olympic bobsledders of Norway
Bobsledders at the 1948 Winter Olympics
Bobsledders at the 1956 Winter Olympics
Norwegian male bobsledders
1919 births
1973 deaths
Sportspeople from Trondheim